Tabort Etaka Preston (sometimes referred to as Preston Tabortetaka) (born 10 June 1998) is a Cameroonian football player who plays as a forward for Las Vegas Lights in the USL Championship.

Club career

Rainbow FC 
Preston began his career in his native Cameroon playing for Rainbow FC.

Charlotte Independence 
He was transferred to Charlotte Independence of the USL Championship in January 2018, but did not make an official appearance for the team before being moved to Albanian club KS Kastrioti.

KS Kastiroti
In 2018, Preston made three appearances with Albanian club KS Kastrioti.

MFK Vyskov 
In 2019, he moved to Czech club MFK Vyskov.

Las Vegas Lights
For the 2019 season, Preston played for Las Vegas Lights. In 31 league appearances with Las Vegas, Preston scored eight goals and recorded three assists in 2,249 minutes played.

San Antonio FC 
Preston signed with San Antonio FC for the 2020 USL season, but after two appearances he and club mutually agreed to part ways.

Hartford Athletic 
Preston signed with Hartford Athletic for the 2021 season.

New Mexico United 
Preston signed a contract for the 2022 season with USL Championship side New Mexico United on December 29, 2021.

Return to Las Vegas 
In February 2023, it was announced that Preston had re-joined former side Las Vegas Lights for their 2023 season.

International career
Preston has represented Camroon at the U-20 level where he made three appearances at the African U-20 Cup of Nations in 2017.

References

External links

1994 births
Living people
Cameroonian footballers
Cameroonian expatriate footballers
Charlotte Independence players
Las Vegas Lights FC players
San Antonio FC players
Hartford Athletic players
New Mexico United players
Association football forwards
USL Championship players
Cameroonian expatriate sportspeople in the United States
Expatriate soccer players in the United States
Expatriate footballers in Albania
Cameroonian expatriate sportspeople in Albania